Derrick Ramon White (born October 12, 1969) is a former American professional baseball first baseman. He played for three seasons in Major League Baseball (MLB) for the Montreal Expos (1993), the Detroit Tigers (1995), and the Chicago Cubs and Colorado Rockies (1998). He also played one season in the KBO League for the Lotte Giants (2000), and one season in Nippon Professional Baseball (NPB) for the Hanshin Tigers (2002).

References

External links 

Career statistics and player information from KBO League

1969 births
Living people
African-American baseball players
Águilas de Mexicali players
Algodoneros de Guasave players
American expatriate baseball players in Canada
American expatriate baseball players in Japan
American expatriate baseball players in Mexico
American expatriate baseball players in South Korea
Baseball players from California
Broncos de Reynosa players
Buffalo Bisons (minor league) players
Chicago Cubs players
Colorado Rockies players
Colorado Springs Sky Sox players
Detroit Tigers players
Hanshin Tigers players
Harrisburg Senators players
Iowa Cubs players
Jamestown Expos players
KBO League outfielders
Lotte Giants players
Major League Baseball first basemen
Midland Angels players
Montreal Expos players
Modesto A's players
Ottawa Lynx players
Portland Sea Dogs players
Potros de Tijuana players
Santa Rosa Bear Cubs baseball players
Sportspeople from San Rafael, California
St. Paul Saints players
Sultanes de Monterrey players
Tecolotes de los Dos Laredos players
Tigres de Quintana Roo players
Toledo Mud Hens players
Toros de Tijuana players
Vancouver Canadians players
Venados de Mazatlán players
West Michigan Whitecaps players
West Palm Beach Expos players
21st-century African-American people
20th-century African-American sportspeople